Keith Hobbs (born July 9, 1952) is a Canadian politician, who was elected mayor of Thunder Bay in Ontario in the 2010 municipal election. Prior to his term in political office, Hobbs served as a member of the Thunder Bay Police for 34 years. Hobbs was born in London, UK and immigrated to Canada at a young age. His family settled in Thunder Bay in 1964. In 2017 Hobbs and city's police chief, J. P. Levesque, were charged with extortion and obstruction of justice by the Ontario Provincial Police.

Criminal charges
On July 21, 2017, Hobbs and his wife were charged by the Ontario Provincial Police with extortion and obstruction of justice. The police statement alleges that Keith and Marisa Hobbs and city resident Mary Voss tried to pressure Alexander Zaitzeff, a prominent lawyer in the city, to buy Voss a house in exchange for her silence regarding an allegation that Zaitzeff had sexually assaulted her. Hobbs took a 90-day leave of absence from his duties as mayor upon the announcement of the charges, returning on September 25.

The city's police chief, J. P. Levesque, has also been under suspension since May after being charged with breach of trust and obstruction of justice for allegedly disclosing confidential information about Hobbs. Police have confirmed that the charges stem from the same investigation. Police subsequently withdrew the obstruction of justice charges. On February 20, 2020, Justice Dawson found Hobbs not guilty of extortion.

City Council Mining meeting disruption
On April 9, 2013, Hobbs, while attending a Thunder Bay City Council meeting, arrested a man who stood up and began shouting profanities and was interrupting the meeting. When police arrived, they verified that the man was intoxicated and charged him for being intoxicated in a public place under the Ontario Liquor Licence Act and was ticketed and fined $65. He was put in a drunk tank, until he sobered up.

References

Mayors of Thunder Bay
Living people
1952 births
Canadian police officers